Susan Lacy may refer to:
 Susan Lacy (producer), creator of American Masters
 Suzanne Lacy (born 1945), American artist and educator